This article lists important figures and events in Malayan public affairs during the year 1961, together with births and deaths of significant Malayans.

Incumbent political figures

Federal level
Yang di-Pertuan Agong: Tuanku Syed Putra of Perlis
Raja Permaisuri Agong: Tengku Budriah of Perlis
Prime Minister: Tunku Abdul Rahman Putra Al-Haj
Deputy Prime Minister: Datuk Abdul Razak

State level
 Sultan of Johor: Sultan Ismail
 Sultan of Kedah: Sultan Abdul Halim Muadzam Shah
 Sultan of Kelantan: Sultan Yahya Petra
 Raja of Perlis: Tuanku Syed Sirajuddin (Regent)
 Sultan of Perak: Sultan Yusuf Izzuddin Shah
 Sultan of Pahang: Sultan Abu Bakar
 Sultan of Selangor: Sultan Salahuddin Abdul Aziz Shah
 Sultan of Terengganu: Sultan Ismail Nasiruddin Shah (Deputy Yang di-Pertuan Agong)
 Yang di-Pertuan Besar of Negeri Sembilan: Tuanku Munawir
 Yang di-Pertua Negeri (Governor) of Penang: Raja Tun Uda
 Yang di-Pertua Negeri (Governor) of Malacca: Tun Leong Yew Koh

(Source: Malaysian Department of Informations)

Events 
 4 January – Tuanku Syed Putra of Perlis was installed as the third Yang di-Pertuan Agong.
 20 February – Tunku Abdul Rahman planned to form a new federation called Malaysia with the merger of Malaya, Singapore, Sabah, Brunei, and Sarawak.
 9 March – The International Quran Reading Competition was held for the first time.
 17 April – Tuanku Munawir of Negeri Sembilan was installed as the ninth Yang di-Pertuan Besar of Negeri Sembilan
 1 May – A landslide occurred in Ringlet, Cameron Highlands, Pahang.
 28 June – Sultan Salahuddin Abdul Aziz Shah was crowned as the 8th Sultan of Selangor.
 July – The Control of Supplies Act 1961 was enacted.
 17 July – Sultan Yahya Petra was crowned as the Sultan of Kelantan.
 13 August – The construction of Malacca State Legislative Assembly in Malacca City, Malacca.
 21 September  – The Kidnapping Act 1961 was enacted.
 30 October–18 November – The 13th Meeting of the Colombo Plan Consultative Committee was held in Kuala Lumpur.
 November – Actor and singers, P. Ramlee marries Singapore-born actor and singer, Saloma.

Births
 1 January – Zulkifli b. Omar – Jeneral of commissioner prison
 9 January – Zahidi Zainul Abidin – Politician
 22 January – P. Kalimuthu (Bentong Kali) – Criminal (died 1993)
 15 February – Mr. Os – Actor and comedian (died 2016)
 6 May – Suhaili Abdul Rahman – Businessman
 19 May – Sabree Fadzil – Actor
 5 August – Hishammuddin Hussein – Politician and minister
 31 August –  – Singer
 6 September – Francissca Peter – Singer
 9 November – Zainal Abidin Hassan – Footballer
 24 November – Takiyuddin Hassan – Politician
 25 November – Salih Yaacob – Actor and comedian
 Unknown date – Mokhzani Mahathir – Politician and businessman
 Unknown date – Sabri Yunus – Actor and comedian

Deaths

See also 
 1961 
 1960 in Malaya | 1962 in Malaya
 History of Malaysia

 
Years of the 20th century in Malaysia
Malaya
1960s in Malaya
Malaya